The Association for Civil Rights in Israel (ACRI) was created in 1972 as an independent, non-partisan not-for-profit organization with the mission of protecting human rights and civil rights in Israel and the territories under its control. ACRI is Israel's oldest and largest human rights organization. Headquartered in Tel Aviv, with offices in Jerusalem, and Nazareth, the organization promotes transparency and accountability in government.

ACRI has been accused by critics, including former Prime Minister Yitzhak Rabin, of defending terrorists.

History

Established in 1972, ACRI views itself as being "committed to promoting the universality of human rights and defending the human rights and civil liberties of all, regardless of religion, nationality, gender, ethnicity, political affiliation, sexual orientation, or socioeconomic background."  The association established its views based on the basic rights recognized in the Universal Declaration of Human Rights, adopted by the United Nations General Assembly in 1948, and the values in Declaration of the Establishment of the State of Israel.

In 1981, ACRI instituted a human rights award to be given to "individuals and organizations that have made an outstanding contribution to the advancement of human rights in Israel". The award was renamed in 1983 as the "Emil Grunzweig Human Rights Award."

In 2009, ACRI organized what has become an annual "Human Rights March" to mark International Human Rights Day (December 10) in Tel Aviv.

Activity 

ACRI's Legal Department argues cases before the Supreme Court of Israel, and also seeks redress before district and labor courts, government ministries, and Knesset committees.

ACRI's Education Department conducts human rights training programs, produces educational curricula in Hebrew and Arabic, and organizes conferences and lectures on human rights education. Additionally, ACRI operates a program on International Humanitarian Law (IHL) and offers IHL educational workshops to social activists, students, educators, youth movement counselors, and students at pre-military academies to "enhance the participants’ knowledge of IHL, and to provide opportunities for discussion and for developing their positions on the issues involved."

ACRI publishes reports and information leaflets; organizes lectures, conferences, film screenings and other public and community events covering a wide range of human rights issues; and runs a public hotline to assist people whose rights have been infringed.

Internationally, ACRI submits shadow reports and provides information to UN committees and representatives regarding Israel’s compliance with its human rights obligations; meets with foreign diplomats and government representatives; participates in international conferences and NGO networks; and raises awareness of human rights issues by generating ongoing international media coverage.

ACRI focus on issues pertaining to Arab Minority Rights, Anti-Democratic Initiatives, Freedom of Expression, LGBT Rights, East Jerusalem, Human Rights Defenders in the Occupied Palestinian Territories (OPT), Migrant Workers, Child Rights, Negev Bedouins, Refugees and Asylum Seekers, Right to Health, Women's Rights, and the Right to Housing.

ACRI deals also with freedom of expression and the right to demonstrate. The association has initiated many legal actions to establish the right to demonstrate and the rights of demonstrators.

Criticism 

Though ACRI does not identify itself politically, activities of the association has been criticized as assisting organizations that harm Israel's national security. Such criticism was made by prime-minister Yitzhak Rabin over an appeal about exiling 400 Hamas activists to Lebanon in 1992. Rabin Called ACRI - "Association for Rights of Hamas". On the other side of the political spectrum, right-wing activists have called it "Association for Palestinian Civil Rights".

In November 2017, Education Minister Naftali Bennett cancelled a conference to be held in cooperation with ACRI following a letter sent by a group of bereaved families accusing ACRI of defending terrorists. ACRI denied the allegations and stated that it does not defend terrorists during their criminal proceedings, rather only in regards to their rights in prison and matters of citizenship and residency.

The Emil Grunzweig human rights award 

The Emil Grunzweig Human Rights Award is awarded annually by Association for Civil Rights in Israel to "individuals and organizations that have made a outstanding contribution to the advancement of human rights in Israel". The award was established in 1981 as an initiative by Professor Jacob Lorch, but was renamed in 1983 after the murder of activist Emil Grunzweig by a grenade thrown by a right-wing Israeli extremist during a Peace Now demonstration against the war in Lebanon.

List of recipients 

Recipients of the award have included:

Funding 

As well as donations from individuals, foundations and other institutions.

International network 
ACRI is a member of the International Network of Civil Liberties Organizations (INCLO), a network of 13 independent human rights organizations around the world with the aim of advancing human liberty in their respective countries. The American Civil Liberties Union (ACLU) is among the oldest of the 13.

Representative publications 
 Overview of Anti-Democratic Legislation Advanced by the 20th Knesset (December 2017)--highlights recent political efforts to undermine gatekeepers of democracy and the Supreme Court of Israel among other efforts to curtail democracy and fundamental rights.
 2012 State of Human Rights Report
 Social Rights Bill (November 2011)
 Unsafe Space: The Israeli Authorities' Failure to Protect Human Rights amid Settlements in East Jerusalem (September 2010)
 Failed Grade: The Education System in East Jerusalem 2010 (August 2010)
 The Infiltration Prevention Bill Lies and Reality (February 2010)

See also 

Human rights in Israel
Racism in Israel

References

External links 
 Association for Civil Rights in Israel

Civil rights organizations
Civil liberties advocacy groups
Non-profit organizations based in Israel
Human rights organizations based in Israel
Liberalism in Israel
Non-governmental organizations involved in the Israeli–Palestinian conflict
Organizations established in 1972